Steakknife are a German punk rock band established in 1991.

Band history 
Originally the band played under the name "Ankry Simons" doing some cover-songs of the American band "Angry Samoans", but later they started to do their own kind of music and recorded the 7" "Gotcha!", which was released in 1990 on X-Mist Records (SIS). The members played (or still play) in Bands like "Spermbirds", "2Bad" and "Challenger Crew". 
Some years later they changed their name into "Steakknife" (which is a songtitle from the "Angry Samoans") and recorded their debut album named "Godpill", which was also released on X-Mist Records in 1995.

Actual line-up 
Lee Hollis - Vocals
Hell G - Bass
Marc Mondial - Guitar
L. Demon - Guitar
Lorenzo Stiletti - Drums

Discography

Albums 
 1995:"Godpill" - LP/CD - X-Mist Records
 1997:"Songs man have died for" - LP/CD - Steakhouse Records/Semaphore
 2000:"Plugged into the amp of god" - LP/CD - Noisolution 
 2005:"Stuff 1991-2004" - CD - Noisolution
 2007:"Parallel universe of the dead" - LP/CD - Rookie Records
 2015:"One eyed Bomb" - LP/CD - Rookie Records

Singles 
 1995:"My home is the gutter" - Split Single with 2BAD - X-Mist Records
 1995:"The day Larry talked" -  X-Mist Records
 1996:"Driving in a dead mans car" - Steakhouse Records
 1998:"3000 $ E.P." - EP - Steakhouse Records
 2001:"The eye of the tiger" - Split single with CRAVING  - Steakhouse Records
 2005:"Abandoned" - Steakhouse Records

External links
 Offizielle Website
 auf MySpace

German punk rock groups